Sync and synch are abbreviations of synchronization, the coordination of events to keep them in time.

Sync or synch may also refer to:

Computing and technology
Sync (Unix), a command and a system call for Unix-like operating systems
Data synchronization, keeping multiple copies of a dataset in coherence with one another
File synchronization or syncing, to synchronize directories or files on computers
Browser synchronization, cloud service provided by web browser vendors for users to synchronize settings and data on multiple devices
Microsoft Sync Framework, a data synchronization platform from Microsoft
Resilio Sync (formerly BitTorrent Sync), a peer-to-peer file synchronization tool 
Synchronization (computer science), relates to similar principles of synchronization of processes or data
SyncToy, a Microsoft PowerToy's software for file synchronization
Syncword, in computer networks, used to synchronize a data transmission by indicating the end of header information and the start of data

Electricity and electronics
Sync, a signal used in composite video systems to coordinate the timings of lines, fields and frames
DIN sync, a standard interface for electronic music instruments
Ford Sync, an in-car communications and entertainment system
Oscillator sync, where a slave oscillator is reset by a master oscillator
Synchronization (alternating current), the process of matching the speed and frequency of a generator or other source to a running network

Arts, entertainment and media

Fictional entities
Synch (comics), a Marvel Comics superhero character
Sync, an enemy character in Tales of the Abyss; see List of Tales of the Abyss episodes

Other uses in arts, entertainment, and media
Synch (band), 1980s band who performed "Where Are You Now"
SYNC (also referred to as "Audiobooks for Teens", or "SyncYA"), a summer giveaway program sponsored by AudioFile magazine
 Sync (2010), a video installation by Max Hattler
Synchronization rights, an example of a music license, defined by a synchronization license
The Sync, a defunct American webcasting company

See also

Sink (disambiguation)
Syncopated
Syncro (disambiguation)